Meltham railway station was the terminus of the Meltham branch line from  (Huddersfield) to Meltham, in the West Riding of Yorkshire, England. Traffic partially started in 1868, but became regular in July 1869. The station, and line, were opened by the Lancashire & Yorkshire Railway (L&YR), later becoming part of the London Midland Scottish Railway. The station closed to passengers in 1949, though the branch remained open to freight until the 1960s. The railway station site is now the location of a supermarket.

History
The branch line to Meltham from Lockwood was opened in August 1868 by the Lancashire & Yorkshire Railway, but was closed soon afterwards owing to the collapse of an embankment. It re-opened to freight in February 1869, and finally to a regular passenger service in July 1869. During the first week of opening, over 2,000 tickets were sold from Meltham station alone. Although the terminus had three sidings serving it, only the northernmost line had a platform.

The town had an extensive goods yard on a lower level to the station, and away from the terminus to the east. It had at least seven sidings and a two-road goods shed. The station was listed as being able to handle livestock, vans, horse boxes, general goods, and coal. In 1922 the L&YR merged into the London and North Western Railway (LNWR), and then a year later became a major constituent of the London Midland Scottish Railway (LMS).

The station was closed to passenger traffic in May 1949. The line remained open for goods well into the 1960s, and occasional special passenger trains were run on the line, such as in June 1950, when 800 schoolchildren went on a trip to London from the station. The site of the station is now a supermarket, and the former railway line trackbed is in use as cycle path 689 to Lockwood.

Services
By 1906, this had been extended to twelve services a day in each direction, though most services ran through to Bradford, two of those ran via the Pickle Bridge line, with the rest going via Cleckheaton Central (the Spen Valley Line). 

The timetable for 1944, five years before closure, shows seven daily out-and-back workings from Bradford Exchange via the Spen Valley Line, with the first service of the day only running to and from Huddersfield.

References

Sources

External links
Lancashire and Yorkshire Railway route map

Disused railway stations in West Yorkshire
Former Lancashire and Yorkshire Railway stations
Railway stations in Great Britain opened in 1869
Railway stations in Great Britain closed in 1949
1869 establishments in England
1949 disestablishments in England